The Black Cherry Bombshells is a webcomic from DC imprint Zuda Comics, created by Johnny Zito and Tony Trov, illustrated by Sacha Borisich and colors by John Dallaire. It was selected as winner of Zuda's March 2008 competition. In 2014, the rights to the series returned to the creators and was re-released by South Fellini.

Synopsis 
Violent girl gangs fight for supremacy in a dark future where all men have been mutated into flesh-eating zombies. In Las Vegas, Nevada, the Black Cherry Bombshells, led by the outcast Regina, are gaining a reputation as tough bootleggers. This does not sit well with a powerful, local crime boss, a woman called The King.

Reception 
The Black Cherry Bombshells was nominated for a Harvey Award in 2009 for Best Online Comic Work.

Footnotes

External links

Zuda Comics titles
2000s webcomics
Webcomics in print
Fictional undead
Zombies in comics
2008 webcomic debuts
2010s webcomics
American webcomics